Edmund Charles "Ed" Francis (June 11, 1926 – November 18, 2016) was a professional wrestler and wrestling promoter in Hawaii in the 1960s.  Many wrestlers who came through Hawaii in the 1960s and 1970s were bound to come across the name Ed Francis.  However, the glory days of territorial wrestling were coming to an end, and in 1979, he sold the 50th State Big Time Wrestling promotion to "High Chief” Peter Maivia.

Personal life
Francis raised his children on the windward side of Kailua, Oahu.  His two sons, Bill and Russ, also enjoyed a wrestling career for a little while.  Russ also had a career in the NFL, playing 13 seasons.  Russ won a Super Bowl playing for the San Francisco 49ers (Jan 1985). 
He later went on to work with the Omaha Beef Arena Football Team.  One of the Francis brothers' contemporaries was wrestler Don Muraco; they attended high school together. Along with his two famous sons he also had four other sons and a daughter, Ed 'sonny' Francis, Steven, Bob, James and Arlene "Pixie" Francis, respectively. He later moved his brood to Eugene, Oregon.

Championships and accomplishments
Cauliflower Alley Club
Other honoree (1994)
Midwest Wrestling Association
MWA Ohio Tag Team Championship (2 times) - with Ray Stevens (1) and Leon Graham (1)
NWA Tri-State
NWA World Junior Heavyweight Championship (1 time)
Pacific Northwest Wrestling
NWA Pacific Northwest Heavyweight Championship (5 times)
Ring Around The Northwest Newsletter
Wrestler of the Year (1957)
Stampede Wrestling
NWA Canadian Heavyweight Championship (Calgary version) (1 time)

References

External links 
 

{{NWA World Junior Heavyweight Championship}|state=collapsed}

50th State Big Time Wrestling
American male professional wrestlers
2016 deaths
Professional wrestling promoters
1926 births
Professional wrestlers from Illinois
20th-century professional wrestlers
NWA World Junior Heavyweight Champions
NWA Canadian Heavyweight Champions (Calgary version)